Abad is a Hispanic surname. Notable people with the surname include:

Andy Abad (born 1972), American baseball player
Antonio Abad (1894–1970), Filipino writer
Carlos Abad (born 1995), Spanish footballer
Carmencita Abad (born 1933), Filipina actress
Diego José Abad y García (1727–1779), Jesuit poet and translator in New Spain and Italy
Fernando Abad (born 1985), Dominican baseball player
Gémino Abad (born 1939), Filipino poet
Margot Abad, Argentine film actress
Mercedes Abad (born 1961), Spanish journalist and short story writer
Pacita Abad (1946–2004), Filipina painter
Pere Esteve i Abad (1942–2005), Catalan politician
Héctor Abad Gómez (1921–1987), Colombian human rights leader
Héctor Abad Faciolince (born 1958), Colombian novelist